Keith Grammar School is a secondary school in, Moray, Scotland. It was built in 1965 by the Educational Committee of Banffshire County Council.  the school roll was 450 pupils. It is administered by the Moray Council Education and Social Care Department.

Notable former pupils
 Brian Adam (1948-2013), politician and biochemist.
 James Naughtie, BBC presenter and journalist.
 Hamish Watt (1925-2014), politician and farmer.
 Maureen Watt (born 1951), SNP politician.

References

External links
Official site

Secondary schools in Moray
Educational institutions established in 1968
1968 establishments in Scotland
Keith, Moray